Ingrandes, also known as Ingrandes-sur-Vienne, is a commune in the Vienne department, region of Nouvelle-Aquitaine, western France.

Demographics

Sleep 
Ingrandes has two accommodation options: Chateau de Fouinières (+33660270396) and castle campsite with outdoor swimming pool Camping Le Petit Trianon. The nearby Châtellerault has more possibilities.

See also
Communes of the Vienne department

References

Communes of Vienne